Joana Josefa de Meneses, Countess of Ericeira (Lisbon, 13 September 1651-Lisbon, 26 August 1709) was a Portuguese courtier and writer. She served as dama camarista (Maid of the Bedchamber) to Catherine of Braganza, regent of Portugal. During Catherine's regency government in the 1700s, Meneses was reportedly her adviser in state affairs. She was also active as a writer.

Works
 Panegírico ao governo da sereníssima senhora Duquesa de Saboia Maria Joana Baptista (1680);
 Reflexões sobre a misericórdia de Deus em fórma de solilóquios (1694);
 Despertador de Alma ao sonho da vida, em voz de um advertido desengano (1695);

References 
 Dicionário Histórico - Portugal

1651 births
1709 deaths
17th-century Portuguese people
18th-century Portuguese people
17th-century Portuguese women writers
17th-century writers
18th-century Portuguese women
Portuguese ladies-in-waiting
People from Lisbon